Return to Waterloo is a 1984 British musical film written and directed by Ray Davies and starring Tim Roth, Kenneth Colley and Claire Parker. The film shows the journey of a commuter from Guildford to Waterloo in London.

Cast
 Kenneth Colley ... The Traveller
 Joan Blackman ... Parent
 Ray Davies ...  Busker
 Timothy Davies ... Parent
 Myrtle Devenish ... Blind Lady
 Roy Evans ... Mortuary Assistant
 Michael Fish ... Weather Forecaster
 Gretchen Franklin ... Gossip
 Christopher Godwin ... Thin Businessman
 Nat Jackley ... Old Soldier
 Claire Rayner ... Agony Aunt
 Tim Roth ... Punk
 Hywel Williams Ellis ... Young Businessman

Production
The soundtrack was provided by members of The Kinks, who released an album Return to Waterloo in connection with it albeit without lead guitarist Dave Davies who refused to participate, hence the album being credited solely to Ray Davies. The film's cinematographer, Roger Deakins, would receive great acclaim in British and American film working with the Coen brothers and Sam Mendes.

Release
The movie was intended for television, and was shown as such on Channel 4 in the United Kingdom on 4 November 1984. In the United States of America, the film was picked up by New Line Cinema and released theatrically on 17 May 1985, premiering at the Waverly in New York City.

References

External links

1985 films
1980s musical films
British musical films
British independent films
Films set on trains
1984 independent films
1980s English-language films
1980s British films